is a retired Japanese athlete specialising in middle-distance events. From Ise, Mie, she competed in the 800 metres at the 2004 Summer Olympics without reaching the semifinals.

She is married to a long-distance runner, Atsushi Sato.

Competition record

Personal bests
Outdoor
800 metres – 2:00.45 (Tokyo 2005) NR
1000 metres – 2:41.08 (Yokohama 2002) AR
1500 metres – 4:09.30  (Kumamoto 2005)

Indoor
800 metres – 2:00.78 (Yokohama 2003) AR

References

1978 births
Living people
People from Ise, Mie
Sportspeople from Mie Prefecture
Japanese female middle-distance runners
Olympic athletes of Japan
Athletes (track and field) at the 2004 Summer Olympics
Athletes (track and field) at the 2002 Asian Games
Athletes (track and field) at the 2006 Asian Games
Asian Games competitors for Japan
Japan Championships in Athletics winners